Paul Ruggeri III (born November 12, 1988)  is a senior elite American gymnast who competed for the University of Illinois and is currently training at the USOTC in Colorado Springs, CO.

Childhood

Ruggeri is the grandson of an Italian immigrant.   His father was a swimmer and his aunt a gymnast.   He attended Fayetteville Manlius High School in his home town of Manlius, New York.   He began gymnastics in 1995 at CNY Gym Centre.

College career

Ruggeri competed for the University of Illinois from 2008 to 2012.  In 2008, Ruggeri was the  NCAA national champion on high bar.  In 2009, he repeated high bar gold and added gold on parallel bars.  In February 2012, Ruggeri competed at the Winter Cup, where he won bronze on floor. He was national champion on vault and won silver on parallel bars; the Illini were also national team champions.  In 2012 he was named the Nissen Award winner, the gymnastics version of the Heisman.

Ruggeri had five years of college gymnastics because he redshirted (cut short or skipped because of injury) his 2011 (senior) year.  The cause was a torn peroneal (ankle) ligament at U.S. elite Winter Cup competition.  Over the years, he won nine All-American honors.

Elite career

In 2010, Ruggeri was an alternate on the U.S. squad at the World Championships.

At the 2011 Pan American Games, Ruggeri won gold on high bar and silver on parallel bars.

At 2012 US Nationals, Ruggeri finished 7th in the all around. A member of the U.S. senior national team, Ruggeri hoped to compete in the 2012 Olympics.  However, he was not selected.  He finished 6th in the all around at Olympic Trials.

As of March 2013, Ruggeri worked as a gymnastics coach and trained for elite competition.  In February 2013, Ruggeri competed at the 2013 Winter Cup, where he won silver on vault and horizontal bar. In April 2013, he participated in a World Cup competition and won gold on vault and high bar.  In recognition, the United States Olympic Committee named him as their male athlete of the month.  On February 6, 2014, he underwent surgery (meniscectomy) for a meniscus tear in the right knee.  He was an alternate on the U.S. men's team to the 2014 world championships.

In February 2015, Ruggeri won the Winter Cup Challenge.  In addition to placing first in the All Around competition, he placed first in vault and high bar, as well as third on floor exercise.  He has been named to the U.S. Gymnastics senior national team for 2015.

On July 11, 2015, Ruggeri helped the U.S. Men's Gymnastics team to their first Gold medal in twenty years at the Pan-American Games.

At the 2015 US Nationals, Ruggeri's notable finishes include placing 8th in the all around, 5th on floor and winning a silver medal on high bar. He was then named to the 2015 World Championship Team that competed in Glasgow, Scotland where he placed 9th of Vault, and 5th as a team. This squad qualified the United States into the 2016 Olympic Games.

Paul was on the scene for three Olympic quads, narrowly missing selection in 2012 and 2016. He came closest to selection in 2016 just after winning National Championships, (P&G Championships) on the horizontal bar, taking second on vault and third on the floor exercise.

Gymnastics traits

Ruggeri considers rings and pommel horse his weak events.  He has vaulted a Yurchenko entry to two different tricks: a half turn and double full off  or (without turn) to  2-1/2 twists (Shewfelt).  His height is 5-8.

Personal

Ruggeri studied molecular biology at the University of Illinois,  with organic chemistry as his favorite class.  School was challenging for him because of the difficulty in balancing sports and studies.  During college, he was targeting becoming a doctor,  but (as of 2013) he considered his options open.  His post-gymnastics plans were to craft a career combining sports and chemistry, perhaps nutrition.

Ruggeri studied art in high school and enjoys painting, drawing and photography.  He also likes acrobatic water and snow sports.

Ruggeri also earned his MBA with a concentration in finance.

Ruggeri is currently earning a bachelor's degree in nursing from Le Moyne College and Saint Joseph's College of Nursing in Syracuse, NY. He is openly gay. ””

References

External links

Routines

Uploads by USA Gymnastics from 2012 National Championships:
 Floor exercise, day 1
 Pommel horse, day 1
 Still rings, day 2
 Vault, day 2
 Parallel bars, day 2
 High bar, day 1

Interviews

Uploads by USA Gymnastics and University of Illinois Athletics:
 2013: Winter Cup
 2012: NCAA championships
 2010: World Championships

1988 births
Living people
American male artistic gymnasts
American people of Italian descent
Illinois Fighting Illini men's gymnasts
Gymnasts at the 2011 Pan American Games
Gymnasts at the 2015 Pan American Games
LGBT gymnasts
Gay sportsmen
Medalists at the World Artistic Gymnastics Championships
Pan American Games gold medalists for the United States
Pan American Games silver medalists for the United States
Pan American Games bronze medalists for the United States
Pan American Games medalists in gymnastics
Sportspeople from Syracuse, New York
American LGBT sportspeople
Medalists at the 2011 Pan American Games
Medalists at the 2015 Pan American Games